Levolor is an American manufacturer of custom window blinds and shades, as well as stock blinds and shades.

History 
The company was founded in 1914 in Hoboken, New Jersey by Hans K. Lorentzen, (June 23, 1887 – January 17, 1974) a Danish immigrant who originally started out as a tool and die maker. Considered the Henry Ford of the window blinds industry, Lorentzen introduced the concepts of standardization, vertical integration, metal manufacturing and assembly lines. In 1993, Levolor was acquired by Newell (known today as Newell Brands). In July 2016, Levolor was sold to Hunter Douglas, a Dutch custom window blind manufacturer, for US$260 million.

Locations 
Levolor is headquartered in the Atlanta, Georgia metropolitan area, and has operations in the United States, Canada, Mexico, and China. As of 2016, the company had approximately 2600 employees.
Levolor products are sold through a number of major retailers including Home Depot, Lowe's, JC Penney's, and RONA, as well as independent dealers and stores.

In Popular Culture 
The rock band Veruca Salt wrote a song titled 'Number One Blind' singing the company name in the chorus. The song is about window blinds keeping the sun away, making it difficult to know what time of day it is.

References

External links 
 

Manufacturing companies based in Atlanta